Women's cricket at the 2014 Asian Games was held in Incheon, South Korea from 20 September to 26 September 2014. Ten women's teams took part in this tournament.

Squads

Results
All times are Korea Standard Time (UTC+09:00)

Group round

Group C

Group D

Knockout round

Quarterfinals

Semifinals

Bronze medal match

Final

Final standing

References

Results

External links
 Official website

Women's tournament